Quzey (also, Quzay) is a village in the municipality of Nüydü in the Agsu Rayon of Azerbaijan.

References

Populated places in Agsu District